Gosling's apalis (Apalis goslingi) is a species of bird in the family Cisticolidae.
It is found in Angola, Cameroon, Central African Republic, Republic of the Congo, Democratic Republic of the Congo, and Gabon.
Its natural habitat is subtropical or tropical moist lowland forest.

The common name and Latin binomial commemorates the explorer Captain G. B. Gosling.

References

Gosling's apalis
Birds of Central Africa
Gosling's apalis
Taxonomy articles created by Polbot